The 1930 Kent State Golden Flashes football team was an American football team that represented Kent State College (later renamed Kent State University) during the 1930 college football season. In its sixth season under head coach Merle E. Wagoner, Kent State compiled a 3–3–1 record and outscored opponents by a total of 61 to 42.

Schedule

References

Kent State
Kent State Golden Flashes football seasons
Kent State Golden Flashes football